Euryxanthops latifrons is a species of crab found in the New Caledonian Exclusive Economic Zone.

References

Xanthoidea
Crustaceans described in 1997